Bishop Island may refer to:
 Bishop Island, in Nunavut, Canada
 Bishop Island (Queensland), in Queensland, Australia
 Manoel Island, in Gżira, Malta, formerly known as il-Gżira tal-Isqof (Bishop's Island)

See also 
 Bishop and Clerk Islets, in the Australian Antarctica
 Bishops and Clerks in Wales
 Bishop Rock, Isles of Scilly, off Cornwall, England